Leader Price, (full name: Société S.A. Leader Price Holding), is a French discount store chain of the Groupe Casino, headquartered in Paris, France.

History
In September 1989, Leader Price was created after the opening of the first store in Paris by Jean Baud and Albert Baussan. From 1989, the chain primarily extended in Paris, with the American group TLC Beatrice becoming the main shareholder.

In September 1997, the Casino group took over Leader Price, with 250 stores (and Franprix, 400 stores) from TLC Beatrice, and opened Leader Price in Belgium.

In March 2010, the chain modernized and changed its logo to a more simple one. Leader Price now has over 500 stores in France.

At the end of November 2020, German discount giant Aldi Nord announced that it had agreed to buy 547 Leader Price stores plus three logistics centers. The purchase prices was to be €717 million and the stores are expected to be integrated into Aldi by 2021.

Leader Price around the world

References

External links

 Leader Price 
 Leader Price Belgium 
 Leader Price Martinique 
 Leader Price Argentina 

Groupe Casino
Companies based in Île-de-France
Retail companies of France
Retail companies established in 1989
Discount stores
1989 establishments in France